Obiteljska televizija Valentino or OTV Valentino is a Bosnian commercial cable television channel based in Bijela in Brčko District.

The program is mainly produced in the Bosnian language or Serbian language and it is available via cable systems throughout the Bosnia and Herzegovina. The channel broadcasts content that is interesting to Bosnian diaspora.

In the media market of BiH, Obiteljska televizija Valentino is a part of the media group called DENI-COMPANI along with sister TV channels: VALENTINO ETNO, Valentino Music HD, PRVA HERCEGOVAČKA and radio station called Obiteljski Radio Valentino.

References

External links 
 Valentino BH
 Communications Regulatory Agency of Bosnia and Herzegovina

Mass media in Brčko
Television stations in Bosnia and Herzegovina
Television channels in North Macedonia